Abdulmambetovo (Äbdelmämbät) is a rural locality (a village) and the administrative centre of Kipchaksky Selsoviet of Burzyansky District, Bashkortostan, Russia. The population was 629 as of 2010. There are 12 streets.

Geography 
Abdulmambetovo is located 44 km northeast of Starosubkhangulovo (the district's administrative centre) by road. Maly Kipchak is the nearest rural locality.

References 

Rural localities in Burzyansky District